is a Japanese football player. He plays for J.FC Miyazaki.

Playing career
Kurotsu was born in Koga on 20 August 1982. After graduating from high school, he joined J2 League club Kawasaki Frontale in 2001. On August 25, 2002, he debuted as substitute at the 76th minutes against Omiya Ardija and scored a winning goal at the 77th minutes. Although he could hardly play in the match for injury in 2003, he played many matches as substitute forward from summer 2004. Frontale also won the champions in 2004 season and was promoted to J1 League. His opportunity to play increased from 2005 and Frontale won the 2nd place in 2006, 2008 and 2009 season. However he could hardly play in the match for injuries from 2011. In 2013, he moved to J2 club Yokohama FC. He played many matches in 3 seasons. In 2016, he moved to J3 League club Gainare Tottori. In 2018, he moved to Regional Leagues club J.FC Miyazaki.

Club statistics

References

External links

at Kawasaki Frontale

1982 births
Living people
Association football people from Ibaraki Prefecture
Japanese footballers
J1 League players
J2 League players
J3 League players
Kawasaki Frontale players
Yokohama FC players
Gainare Tottori players
J.FC Miyazaki players
Association football forwards